Dipanwit Dashmohapatra is an Indian actor and theater artist who predominantly works in Odia movies and web series.

Early life
Dipanwit was born in Soro in Balasore district of Odisha to Jyotsna & Jeetendra Dashmohapatra. He did his schooling from Ramakrishna Sikhshya Niketana and S.N. High School of Soro. Later, his higher secondary from Upendranath College. He completed his degree in Electrical Engineering from ITER, Siksha 'O' Anusandhan, Bhubaneswar.

Career
Dipanwit started acting in plays from his college days. He has worked with many prominent theatre groups like Toneelstuk and Uttar Purush Theatre Group. He is an active member of JEEVAN REKHA THEATRE GROUP of Bhubaneswar.

He was introduced in industry by actor Samaresh Routray's production house OdiaOne. He initially acted in several Music videos and Web series, the most popular being RABANA PODI and then forayed into Art and Feature films.

He came into major lime light with movie DAMaN in a supporting role alongside Babushaan.His first movie as lead Pratikshya has been selected for screening in Indian Panaroma section of IFFI 2022 and has won the Best Story Feature Film Award at the Washington DC South Asia Film Festival (DCSAFF) 2022.Anupam Kher has announced latter's Hindi remake in IFFI press conference.

Filmography

Films

References

External Links 

 

Male actors in Odia cinema
Living people
1995 births
Odia people